CapStar Bank is a bank based in Nashville, Tennessee, United States. It has branches in Nashville, Brentwood, Hendersonville, Gallatin, Athens, Etowah, Cleveland, Knoxville, Sweeetwater, Madisonville, Waynesboro, Collinwood, Lawrenceburg, Manchester, Murfreesboro, and Woodbury. The bank offers a full range of commercial and consumer financial products and services.

History
CapStar Bank was co-founded by Dennis C. Bottorff and Claire W. Tucker on July 14, 2008, with U.S. $88 million. It had grown upwards of U.S. $3 billion in assets by 2021.

Acquisitions 
Capstar Financial Holdings Inc., the parent company of CapStar Bank, established a subsidiary, Farmington Mortgage, a home mortgage company, in 2014. CapStar acquired Athens Bancshares Corporation (Athens Federal Community Bank) in 2018, adding eight East Tennessee financial centers, and acquired FBC Corporation in 2020, including the First National Bank of Manchester and the Bank of Waynesboro.

References

Companies based in Nashville, Tennessee
Banks established in 2008
2008 establishments in Tennessee
Banks based in Tennessee